The 2022 New York City FC season was the club's eighth season in Major League Soccer, the top division of soccer in the United States. The club entered the season as the defending MLS Cup champions, having won the 2021 title. NYCFC also participated in the 2022 CONCACAF Champions League and were eliminated in the semifinals by Seattle Sounders FC.

Player movement

In

Out

Current roster 
Current as of November 2, 2022.

Non-competitive

Preseason

Competitive

Major League Soccer

Standings

Eastern Conference

Overall table

Matches

MLS Cup Playoffs

U.S. Open Cup

CONCACAF Champions League

Round of 16

Quarter-finals

Semi-finals

Campeones Cup

References

2022 in sports in New York City
American soccer clubs 2021 season
2022
2022 Major League Soccer season
2022 CONCACAF Champions League participants seasons